Oscar Edmund Berninghaus (October 2, 1874 – April 27, 1952) was an American artist and a founding member of the Taos Society of Artists. He is best known for his paintings of Native Americans, New Mexico and the American Southwest. His son, Charles Berninghaus (1905–1988), was also a Taos artist.

Early life and education
Oscar Berninghaus was born on October 2, 1874 in St. Louis, Missouri. His father ran a lithography business, which stimulated an interest in watercolor painting in Oscar.  The young artist regularly sketched local scenes around St. Louis, including the St. Louis riverfront.  He developed an interest in business and sold his works to tourists and newspapers. At sixteen, he had quit school and taken a job with Compton & Sons, a local lithography company, where he started as an errand boy, but soon learned the technical details of engraving, color separation and printmaking. In 1893, he left Compton & Sons and joined Woodward and Tiernan, one of the largest printing concerns in the world at the time.

In search of something more than the practical experience he was receiving at the lithography companies, Berninghaus attended night classes at the St. Louis School of Fine Arts at Washington University in St. Louis and sketched and painted in his spare time.

St. Louis artistic career
By 1899, Berninghaus held his first one-man show, developed a reputation as an artist, and worked teaching illustration at the School of Fine Arts.  He was offered a commission by the Denver and Rio Grande Railroad to produce promotional sketches of the Colorado and New Mexico landscapes and soon traveled West.  After spending a day in Denver, he traveled south to Antonito, Colorado on a standard gauge railroad before transition to a narrow gauge track for the remainder of his trip into New Mexico.  All the while, Berninghaus sketched, and was eventually invited by the conductor to ride on the top of the train car.

When he passed nearby Taos, New Mexico he disembarked the train and travelled overland.  During his 8-day stay, he met and befriended Bert Phillips, who had established himself as a painter in Taos the previous year. Although he soon returned to St. Louis, and was married to Emelia Miller in 1900, Berninghaus was captivated by the local Indian culture and the landscape and light of New Mexico.  For the next few years, the painter lived in St. Louis during the winters, where he pursued his commercial illustration work, and returned to Taos in the summers to pursue his fine art painting.

In 1903 Berninghaus had two designs selected for the 1904 St. Louis World's Fair medal competition.  In 1905 Berninghaus and his wife, Emelia, had their second son, Julius Charles Berninghaus, who would go on to become a well known New Mexican landscape painter in his own right.  By 1908 the painter had firmly established himself as one of St. Louis' foremost artists, having won a competition at the St. Louis Post-Dispatch, become a member of the St. Louis Artists' Guild, the Society of Western Artists, and the Salmagundi Club, and held a one-man exhibition of fifty Western paintings at the Noonan-Kocian Gallery.

In 1914, a year after his wife died of diabetes, the Anheuser-Busch Brewing Company release a promotional booklet titled Epoch Marking Events of American History that was composed of billboard illustrations that Berninghaus had previously completed for the company.  The book included 10 paintings by the artist featuring historical events important to the American West, including Hernando de Soto's founding the Mississippi River, Jacques Marquette's descending the same river, Pierre Laclède's founding of St. Louis, a scene from the Lewis and Clark Expedition, John C. Frémont, a pioneer wagon train on the Salt Lake Trail, and a Union Pacific train.  Berninghaus painted a number of paintings for the Busch family throughout his lifetime, many of which were donated to the St. Louis Art Museum.

Taos Society of Artists

In 1915, he became a founding member of the Taos Society of Artists, along with his friend Bert Phillips and four other artists. He was the first (temporary) chairman of the Society. He also spent more time as secretary of the Society than any other member. In 1917, Berninghaus received his first formal accolade for his Taos Indian-based fine art; the prestigious and much coveted St. Louis Artists' Guild Brown Prize for his painting The Sage Brush Trail.  This painting went on to be exhibited at The Annual Exhibition, Pennsylvania Academy of Fine Arts (1917), National Academy of Design, Winter Exhibition (1917), Art World Winter Show, Academy of Design (1918), and numerous other national exhibitions. This painting is referenced in many publications including "American Art Annual", volume 14, 1017, "El Palacio", Volume VIII (1920), "Painters, Pictures and The People", Neuhaus (1918), "Art World" Ruckstull (1917), "American Art Directory, American Federation of Arts" (1918), "Master Painter of American Indians and The Frontier West", Sanders. He continued to reside in St. Louis until 1925, when he finally made the move to Taos.

In 1917, Berninghaus received his first formal accolade for his Taos Indian-based fine art; the prestigious St. Louis Artists' Guild Brown Prize for his painting The Sage Brush Trail.  This painting went on to be exhibited at The Annual Exhibition, Pennsylvania Academy of Fine Arts (1917), National Academy of Design, Winter Exhibition (1917), Art World Winter Show, Academy of Design (1918), and numerous other national exhibitions.  Arguably his first Taos work to receive national recognition and acclaim, this painting is referenced in many publications including "American Art Annual", volume 14, 1017, "El Palacio", Volume VIII (1920), "Painters, Pictures and The People", Neuhaus (1918), "Art World" Ruckstull (1917), "American Art Directory, American Federation of Arts" (1918), "Master Painter of American Indians and The Frontier West", Sanders. He continued to reside in St. Louis until 1925, when he finally made the move to Taos.

Berninghaus was committed to the artist colony of Taos, maintained the Society's business affairs, and insisted that Taos would be the single location from which a distinctly American Art would originate; "We have had French, Dutch, Italian and German art. Now we have American art. I feel that from Taos will come that art."

In 1936, Berninghaus was commissioned to paint Commerce on the Levee, a rendition of early commercial life in St. Louis.  Upon completing the 8 foot x 12 foot canvas in his Taos, New Mexico studio, the painter is said to have wrapped the work around a stovepipe to be shipped east.  The work was installed in the lobby of the St. Louis Star Times. o

Art clubs and associations
Berninghaus was a member of the following arts organizations:
 National Academy of Design, New York, NY, Associate, 1926
 Salmagundi Club, New York, NY
 Society of Western Artists, Secretary 1911-1913
 Taos Society of Artists, founding member, 1915-1927
 St. Louis Artists' Guild, board member
 Two by Four Club, St. Louis, Missouri
 Painters Group of the Middle West
 Deuce Poker Club

Collections
Today Berninghaus paintings can be found in the collections of:
 Amon Carter Museum (Fort Worth, Texas)
 Sid Richardson Museum (Fort Worth, Texas)
 New Mexico Museum of Art  (Santa Fe, New Mexico)
 St. Louis Art Museum
 Colby College Museum of Art (Waterville, ME)
 Gilcrease Museum (Tulsa, Oklahoma)
 Stark Museum of Art (Orange, Texas)
 Nelson-Atkins Museum; Wichita Art Museum
 Blanton Museum of Art, Austin

Murals
Berninghaus's murals adorn the walls of:
 Missouri State Capitol (Jefferson City, Missouri)
 Gateway Arch National Park, St.Louis, Missouri
 Fort Scott, Kansas post office, Border Gateways
 Phoenix Federal Building and post office, Phoenix, AZ
 Weatherford, Oklahoma Post Office

See also
 Ernest L. Blumenschein
 E. Irving Couse
 W. Herbert Dunton
 E. Martin Hennings
 Walter Ufer

References

External links
Paintings
Making Camp (ca. 1930)
Spring Plowing (1937)
Adobe House (1940)
The Forty-niners (before 1942)
The Rabbit Hunter (ca. 1945)
Taos Indian Couple
Taos Indians on Mesa
Las Truchas Peaks, NM (ca. 1949)

1874 births
1952 deaths
19th-century American painters
American male painters
20th-century American painters
American muralists
Artists of the American West
Painters from Missouri
Artists from Taos, New Mexico
Modern artists
Artists from St. Louis
Taos Society of Artists
Sam Fox School of Design & Visual Arts alumni
Painters from New Mexico
Section of Painting and Sculpture artists